Phrynomedusa is a genus of tree frogs from the Southeast and South regions in Brazil. They were formerly considered to be part of the genus Phyllomedusa, as the "Phyllomedusa fimbriata group". Common names colored leaf frogs and monkey frogs have been coined for them.

Ecology and conservation
Phrynomedusa occur in mountain streams and associated ponds in the Atlantic Forest. Egg clutches are laid outside of the water in rock crevices above the water; the tadpoles develop in the water.

Phrynomedusa are rare and poorly known frogs. Except for P. appendiculata and P. marginata, they are known from only a few specimens. Only two species are known with certainty to occur in protected areas.

Description
Phrynomedusa are small tree-frogs: adult males measure  and females  in snout–vent length. The iris is bicolored (a horizontal diffuse dark stripe in middle of eye separating dark yellow in upper and lower surfaces). The dorsum is smooth. Webbing between the fingers and toes is reduced. They lack the flash colors on flanks, preaxial, and postaxial margins of thighs present in the related phyllomedusid genera. Males have vocal sacs and vocal slits.

Species
There are six species, one of them probably extinct:

References

 
Phyllomedusinae
Amphibian genera
Amphibians of South America
Endemic fauna of Brazil
Taxa named by Alípio de Miranda-Ribeiro